was a Japanese nurse and politician. She initially campaigned for her husband, the politician Kenji Yamazaki, but when he returned from the war with a new wife and child she ran against him. She defeated him as a candidate from the Socialist Party of Japan. She would become concerned with fighting child prostitution.

References 

1900 births
1983 deaths
Female members of the House of Councillors (Japan)
Members of the House of Councillors (Japan)
Female members of the House of Representatives (Japan)
Members of the House of Representatives (Japan)
People from Okayama Prefecture
Japanese nurses
20th-century Japanese women politicians
20th-century Japanese politicians